Mankri may refer to:

Mankri, Rajasthan, a village in Neem-Ka-Thana tehsil, Rajasthan, India
Makri, Bulandshahr, a village in Uttar Pradesh, India
Man-kri, a title of Burmese monarchs

See also 
 Mankrai, union council in Pakistan